Elorde is the surname of the following people:
Gabriel Elorde (1935–1985), Filipino boxer 
Juan Martin Elorde (born 1984), Filipino boxer, grandson of Gabriel
Juan Miguel Elorde (born 1986), Filipino boxer, grandson of Gabriel, brother of Juan Martin
Nico Elorde, Filipino basketball player, grandson of Gabriel, brother of Juan Miguel and Juan Martin